Bux may refer to:

 BUX, the Budapest Stock Index
 BUX (band), an American hard rock/boogie rock band
 BUX (brokerage), a European mobile brokerage company
 Bux (surname), including a list of people with the name
 Bunia Airport, Democratic Republic of the Congo (IATA code: BUX)
 Buxton railway station, Derbyshire, England (National Rail station code: BUX)

See also
 Buksh, a surname or given name
 Buchs (disambiguation)
 Bucks (disambiguation)
 Bucs (disambiguation)